Gissing  is a village and civil parish in Norfolk, England, about six miles (10 km) north of Diss. The village is the location of Gissing Hall, a fifteenth-century mansion which is now operated as a hotel.

The villages name means 'Gyssa's/*Gyssi's people'.

Church of St Mary
The church, St Mary, is one of 124 existing round-tower churches in Norfolk. It is a Grade I listed building. In 1209 there was a rectory; in 1271, a vicarage was endowed with "all the offerings, the tithes of the mills, a vicarage-house and meadow, and an acre of land adjoining, and twenty acres more of the church's free land, and all other small tithes, except hay, which, with all the corn tithes, and the rest of the glebe, together with the rectory manor, and all its appurtenances, were to belong to the prior himself."

There are monuments to members of the Kemp family, including Sir Robert Kemp (d.1710) and both his wives. His memorial is by Edward Stanton. The monument to Sir John Kemp (d.1815) is by the London sculptor Charles Regnart.

Mid-air collision
On  29 January 1944, two United States Army Air Forces, Consolidated B-24 Liberator (42-7669 and 42-100005) collided in mid-air on an assembly mission to Frankfurt from RAF Tibenham, and both aircraft crashed near Gissing. The collision killed 25 crew on both aircraft.

References

External links

St Mary's on the European Round Tower Churches website

Villages in Norfolk
Civil parishes in Norfolk